Archibald Hastie (1915–1988) was a Scottish professional footballer who played for Partick Thistle, Huddersfield Town and Motherwell.

He played for Bradford City between 1938 and 1945, scoring nine goals in 31 official appearances, in a career interrupted by the Second World War, during which he served in the Royal Navy; he later also coached the club.

References

Scottish footballers
Sportspeople from Shotts
Footballers from North Lanarkshire
Association football inside forwards
Scottish Football League players
English Football League players
Scottish Junior Football Association players
Douglas Water Thistle F.C. players
Partick Thistle F.C. players
Huddersfield Town A.F.C. players
Motherwell F.C. players
Selby Town F.C. players
Bradford City A.F.C. players
Bradford City A.F.C. non-playing staff
Association football coaches
Plymouth Argyle F.C. wartime guest players
1915 births
1988 deaths
Royal Navy personnel of World War II